Monroe Barr Mitchell (September 11, 1901 in Starkville, Mississippi – September 4, 1976 in Valdosta, Georgia), was an American  Major League Baseball pitcher.

External links

1901 births
1976 deaths
Sportspeople from Starkville, Mississippi
Baseball players from Mississippi
Mississippi State Bulldogs baseball players
Washington Senators (1901–1960) players
Major League Baseball pitchers